Chahar Borj (also Romanized as Chahār Borj; also known as Chahār Būrj and Chehār Burj) is a village in Rudhaleh Rural District, Rig District, Ganaveh County, Bushehr Province, Iran. At the 2006 census, its population was 263, in 63 families.

References 

Populated places in Ganaveh County